Paul Ruppert Baldacci (January 25, 1907 – November 1, 1984) was an American football player and coach.  He served as the head football coach at the University of Akron in Ohio from 1946 to 1947, compiling a record of 7–10.

Baldacci was born in Virginia to Louis and Roselee (Carrera) Baldacci, Italian immigrants to the United States.

Head coaching record

College

References

External links
 

1907 births
1984 deaths
American  football halfbacks
Akron Zips football coaches
William & Mary Tribe football players
High school football coaches in Virginia
Sportspeople from Richmond, Virginia
Coaches of American football from Virginia
Players of American football from Richmond, Virginia